The Territorial Council of Saint Barthélemy (Conseil territorial de Saint-Barthélemy) is the consultative assembly for Saint Barthélemy. The legislature comprises 19 territorial councillors.

See also
 Territorial Council of Saint Martin
 Territorial Council of Saint Pierre and Miquelon

References

Unicameral legislatures
Government of Saint Barthélemy
Politics of Saint Barthélemy
Legislatures of Overseas France